Výrava is a municipality and village in Hradec Králové District in the Hradec Králové Region of the Czech Republic. It has about 400 inhabitants.

Administrative parts
The village of Dolní Černilov is an administrative part of Výrava.

References

Villages in Hradec Králové District